was a Japanese football player and manager. He managed Japan national team.

Playing career
Takahashi was born in Fukushima on April 11, 1916. He played for Waseda University. He won 1938 Emperor's Cup with Sei Fuwa, Sekiji Sasano, Kunitaka Sueoka, Shogo Kamo and so on. After graduation from university, he played for Hitachi from 1941 to 1958.

Coaching career
From 1955, Takahashi started managering career too. In 1957, he became manager for Japan national team as Shigemaru Takenokoshi successor for tour for China. In 1959, he became manager for Japan U-20 national team for 1959 AFC Youth Championship and won 3rd place. In 1960, he managed for Japan national team as Takenokoshi successor again. He managed at 1962 World Cup qualification and 1962 Asian Games until 1962. After that, he managed for Hitachi.

On February 5, 2000, Takahashi died of pneumonia in Meguro, Tokyo at the age of 83. In 2009, he was selected Japan Football Hall of Fame.

References

External links
Japan Football Hall of Fame at Japan Football Association
Japan Soccer Archive: Biography and pictures

1916 births
2000 deaths
Waseda University alumni
Association football people from Fukushima Prefecture
Japanese footballers
Kashiwa Reysol players
Japanese football managers
Japan national football team managers
Association football forwards